The Ayacucho Municipality is one of the 29 municipalities that makes up the western Venezuelan state of Táchira and, according to a 2007 population estimate by the National Institute of Statistics of Venezuela, the municipality has a population of 60,454.  The town of Colón is the municipal seat of the Ayacucho Municipality.

Demographics
The Ayacucho Municipality, according to a 2007 population estimate by the National Institute of Statistics of Venezuela, has a population of 60,454 (up from 50,992 in 2000). This amounts to 5.1% of the state's population.

Government
The mayor of the Ayacucho Municipality is Gabino Paz Guerrero, re-elected on October 31, 2004, with 47% of the vote.  The municipality is divided into three parishes; Ayacucho, Rivas Berti, San Pedro del Río.

References

External links
ayacucho-tachira.gob.ve 

Municipalities of Táchira